Chega (officially stylised as CHEGA!) is a national conservative, right-wing populist political party in Portugal formed in 2019 by André Ventura. It is characterized as being between the right-wing and far-right of the political spectrum.

Its inclusion in the register of Portuguese political parties was accepted by the Constitutional Court on 9 April 2019. On the 12th of April 2019, it announced that the head of its list to the European Parliament is Ventura. Chega was part of the Basta! coalition for the 2019 European Parliament election in Portugal. In the 2019 Portuguese legislative election it won one seat in the Portuguese Parliament. In the 2022 general election, receiving 7.2% of the vote, it increased its seat count to 12.

Ideology 
Chega considers itself a party with nationalist, conservative and personalist roots. It defends the promotion of an effective judicial system and the decrease of the State's intervention in the economy. The party also presents itself as national conservative and social conservative.

The agenda of CHEGA party is heavily focused on criminality issues, support for the police forces of the country, and the misuse of taxpayers' money in terms of corruption at the top, overstaffing in the civil service at the middle and undeserving welfare recipients at the bottom.

The party advocates for a decrease of the tax incidence, considering the current tributary system to be "brutal and aggressive to the ones who work and build wealth, taking away half of their incomes". It additionally defends a reduction of both bureaucracy and the number of bureaucrats, asserting that it is one of the main reasons for the "Portuguese competitive economic backwardness".

The party supports life imprisonment and chemical castration. Some members also support the death penalty for crimes such as terrorism or child abuse; in a 2020 party referendum, 44% voted in favor.

Describing itself a strong proponent of Western civilization, the party positions itself against Islamist extremism and proposes stronger border controls and a decrease of "mass and illegal immigration". It has been also described as antiziganist. The party supports integration measures for immigrants and states that all immigrants and foreign residents should be "obliged to respect our rules, rites, customs and traditions." It also supports bilateral agreements and immigration from former Portuguese colonies such as Brazil, Portuguese-speaking African countries, Macau and East Timor while taking a more critical stance on non-Western immigration. It also calls for a zero tolerance policy on illegal immigration and for the deportation of immigrants with criminal records or those who are economically inactive. It is also opposed to multiculturalism and the practice of sharia law within the Portuguese legal system, but also claims to reject xenophobia on its platform.

Chega's stance on the European Union has been described as Eurosceptic. The party states that it supports the original "four freedoms" principle of free movement of goods, capital, services and people among member states, but argues for a "Europe of sovereign nations united by shared Greco-Roman and Judeo-Christian principles" and opposes interference into national political decision making within member states by the EU. It also calls on Portugal to pursue more independent foreign and economic policies from Brussels and rejects compulsory EU migrant and refugee quotas. Furthermore, the party also argues that Portugal should exit the EU if it tries to become a federal state.

Election results

Assembly of the Republic
Vote share in the Portuguese legislative elections

European elections

Regional Assemblies

Local elections

Presidential elections

Leadership elections 
The 2020 Chega leadership election was held on 6 September 2020. André Ventura was re-elected with more than 99% of the vote, facing no opposition.

In 2020, the press notes the "guerrilla atmosphere" prevailing within the party, the result of tensions between the different factions that make up the party.

Critical response 
Due to its anti-establishment, anti-immigration, anti-Islam and populist stances, Chega has been the target of numerous critics who underline the party's extreme views on various subjects, some of which include the negative comments regarding immigration and minorities, namely the Roma community, its opposition to certain aspects of the constitution, its criticism of the judicial leniency regarding serious crimes, and governmental over-expenditure with public services.

In response to some of the mainstream criticism, the party's president, André Ventura, denounced the accusations of racism, claiming that Chega defends equal rights and duties, and that it "doesn't desire a country on which minorities can believe they have more rights than others simply for being minorities". On 27 June 2020, the party organized a protest entitled "Portugal is not racist", where Ventura further mentioned that there is no structural racism in Portugal, and that the political left uses racism as a pretext to foment political agendas.

The party has also been targeted with critics for reusing a slightly modified version of the motto of the Portuguese dictator António de Oliveira Salazar "Deus, Pátria, Família" (God, Fatherland, Family). The party has been criticized for having supporters of Salazar within their ranks.

See also 
 Assembly of the Republic
 List of political parties in Portugal
 Politics of Portugal

References

External links
 

2019 establishments in Portugal
Anti-immigration politics in Europe
Antiziganism in Portugal
Anti-Islam political parties in Europe
Anti-Islam sentiment in Portugal
Conservative parties in Portugal
Eurosceptic parties in Portugal
Far-right parties in Portugal
Far-right politics in Portugal
Member parties of the Identity and Democracy Party
National conservative parties
Political parties established in 2019
Political parties in Portugal
Right-wing parties in Europe
Right-wing populism in Portugal
Right-wing populist parties